Life Among the Savages is a collection of short stories edited into novel form, written by Shirley Jackson.  Originally these stories were published individually in women's magazines such as Good Housekeeping, Woman's Day, Mademoiselle, and others. Published in 1952, Life Among the Savages is a moderately fictionalised memoir of the author's life with her own four children, an early work in what Laura Shapiro calls "the literature of domestic chaos".

Plot summary
Jackson—speaking as the nameless mother who serves as narrator—relates a period of roughly six years in the life of her family, focusing particularly on her attempts to keep peace and domestic efficiency despite her increasing number of children. As the book's primary incidents begin, the family has "two children and about five thousand books" when they are abruptly given notice to evict from their city apartment. After a frantic last-minute search, they come upon the perfect home in the country and prepare to adjust to their new quiet-but-quirky life as newcomers to a small, insular New England village. The book relays a series of small comical adventures largely contrasting the children's natural acceptance of the change with their parents' struggles to keep up with them, such as eldest child Laurie's introduction to kindergarten (and his daily reporting of troublemaker classmate Charles' antics); middle child Jannie's insistence that her seven imaginary daughters (who all have the same name) be taken into account on every family outing; the comedy of the family's third child, Sally, whose lengthy delay in being born throws the whole family into chaos; and the night the entire family came down with grippe and the ensuing mix-ups. The book closes with the birth of a fourth and final child, Barry, who is again a fictional stand-in for Jackson's youngest child. The book was followed by a sequel, Raising Demons.

Characters
 The Narrator: A stay-at-home mother who is never identified by name, she maintains the role of detached, amused observer.  Despite several attempts to hire domestic help, she is invariably the only force that can make her family's gears mesh smoothly.  The narrator is assumed to be Shirley Jackson herself.
 The Children's Father: Referred to only as "my husband", the children's father is assumed to be a representation of Jackson's own husband, Stanley Edgar Hyman (once his initials are given as S.E.H.).  Although the children's father can be motivated to involve himself in such manly pursuits as shooting at stray rodents with an air gun and cheering at Laurie's Little League games, he is mostly a stereotypical hands-off father who makes domestic proclamations from behind his newspaper.  He is also shown to be deeply interested—nearly obsessed—with his coin collection.
Laurie: A good-natured, athletic little boy, Laurie enjoys a variety of typical all-American pursuits including baseball, Cub Scouts, horses, and getting into scuffles.  Like any small boy, he resents when his mother shows him too much affection in public, and he frequently expresses embarrassment of his younger sisters (whom he refers to collectively as "the kids").  One of the major points in the story comes when Laurie is struck by a car and injured; although this is played off for comedy in the book, this incident actually occurred with the real Laurence Hyman.  He is five when the major action opens and about nine when the story ends.
 Jannie:  She is roughly three years younger than Laurie.  She is presented as an imaginative yet extremely traditionally feminine little girl who enjoys playing games of make-believe with her dolls and her seven imaginary "daughters".  While Jannie often deliberately sets herself up as the winsome "good girl" to Laurie's more frequent naughtiness ("Was Laurie bad?  I'm good, aren't I?  Did Laurie do something new bad?"), the two older children often work in collusion to frustrate their parents.
 Sally: Referred to for much of the book as "the baby" (until the prospect of another infant usurps her status), Sally is roughly three years younger than Jannie.  While occasionally joining forces with her older siblings, Sally is more often described as living in "a form-fitting fairyland".  She is highly imaginative, to the point of baffling her parents, and is often stubborn and self-assured beyond her years.
 Barry: The youngest of the children, Barry appears only as a baby newly arrived from the hospital.  The other children admire him briefly ("I guess we figured on something a little bigger") before dismissing him as something to keep their mother busy now that they "are all grown up."

Sources 
Penguin page of the book

References 

1952 short story collections
Short story collections by Shirley Jackson
Books by Shirley Jackson